Thomas James Soares (born 10 July 1986) is an English professional footballer who plays as a midfielder for Marlow. He has previously played for Crystal Palace, Stoke City, Bury, AFC Wimbledon and Stevenage.

Career

Crystal Palace
Born in Reading, Berkshire, Soares came up through the Crystal Palace academy, playing in central midfield. When he made the Palace first team he was used as a winger. Under the management of Neil Warnock, however, Soares was played in central midfield. His driving runs, combined with his best goalscoring season to date, meant that he was a key performer in the 2007–08 season for Palace.

Stoke City
In August 2008 Soares joined Premier League newcomers Stoke City for a fee of £1.25 million. He made an impressive start, as in his second match for Stoke he won two penalty kicks in a 2–1 win against Tottenham Hotspur at the Britannia Stadium. Soares played a few more matches for Stoke, against Sunderland, Manchester City, Portsmouth and West Bromwich Albion. After playing against Hartlepool United in the FA Cup, however, Soares failed to make a league appearance. He was loaned out to Charlton Athletic for the remainder of the 2008–09 season, but failed to help keep them in the Championship. Soares scored one goal for Charlton, on 3 February against Bristol City.

Back at Stoke, he failed to make a Premier League appearance in the 2009–10 season. On 26 November 2009 Soares joined Sheffield Wednesday, initially on a month-long loan deal, but he remained there until the end of the season. As with Charlton, Soares was part of a team who were relegated from the Championship. His misery was compounded by it coming at the hands of former club Crystal Palace, who stayed up at Wednesday's expense. Soares had now been relegated three times in his short career. In March 2011, Soares played for Stoke for the first time in almost 18 months, against Cardiff City in the FA Cup. Soares again failed to make a single Premier League appearance for Stoke during the 2010–11 and 2011–12 seasons. His last league appearance for Stoke was in December 2008.

On 23 January 2012, Soares joined Scottish Premier League club Hibernian on loan until the end of the 2011–12 season. He scored two goals in a 3–1 win against Kilmarnock on 25 February.

He was released by Stoke at the end of the 2011–12 season.

On 16 August 2012, it was reported by The News that Soares was training with Portsmouth.

Bury
On 9 November 2012, Soares joined Bury on non-contract terms. He re-signed for Bury on a two-year deal on 2 July 2013. Soares scored the winning goal against Tranmere Rovers on the last day of the 2014–15 season that gained Bury 3rd place and automatic promotion to League One.

AFC Wimbledon

On 31 January 2017, Soares left Bury and signed for fellow League One side AFC Wimbledon. He scored his first goal for the club on 1 January 2018 against Southend United.

Stevenage
After spending the pre-season with Stevenage FC he officially signed for the club on 2 August 2019.

In July 2021, Soares joined Southern Football League side Dorchester Town, where he went on to make 25 league appearances.

Personal life
His brother Louie is also a footballer, who has represented Barbados.

Career statistics

A.  The "Other" column constitutes appearances and goals in the Football League play-offs, UEFA Europa League, EFL Trophy and FA Trophy

References

External links

1986 births
Sportspeople from Reading, Berkshire
Living people
Association football midfielders
English footballers
England under-21 international footballers
Crystal Palace F.C. players
Stoke City F.C. players
Charlton Athletic F.C. players
Sheffield Wednesday F.C. players
Hibernian F.C. players
Bury F.C. players
Premier League players
English Football League players
Black British sportsmen
English people of Barbadian descent
Scottish Premier League players
AFC Wimbledon players
Stevenage F.C. players
Footballers from Berkshire
Dorchester Town F.C. players
Southern Football League players
Marlow F.C. players
Isthmian League players